Chalmers Pangburn Wylie (November 23, 1920 – August 14, 1998) was an American politician and lawyer from Ohio, who served in various public offices in that state before serving thirteen terms as a member of the United States House of Representatives from 1967 to 1993.

Biography 

Wylie was born in Norwich, Ohio, and grew up in Pataskala, a small community east of Columbus. He attended Otterbein College in Westerville and Ohio State University in Columbus. He earned his Juris Doctor at Harvard Law School in 1948.

Wylie enlisted in the United States Army as a private, and eventually attaining the rank of first lieutenant while serving with the 30th Infantry Division in Europe during World War II. He remained in the U.S. Army Reserve after the war, attaining the rank of lieutenant colonel.

He was:
 assistant attorney general of Ohio from 1951 to 1954
 assistant city attorney of Columbus, Ohio, from 1949 to 1950
 elected city attorney of Columbus, Ohio, from 1953 to 1956
 administrator of the Bureau of Workman's Compensation for the State of Ohio in 1957
 appointed first assistant to the Governor of Ohio in 1957
 elected president of Ohio Municipal League
 elected to three terms in the State Legislature of Ohio, 1961–1967
 elected as a Republican for 13 terms to the United States Congress (January 3, 1967 – January 3, 1993)

In addition to his public service, Wylie worked in private practice as an attorney from 1957 until 1968, which he resumed in Columbus after leaving Congress until his death there.

The Chalmers P. Wylie VA Ambulatory Care Center in Columbus is named in his honor.

Opposition to Playboy's Braille edition 
In 1981, Republican Senator Mack Mattingly had unsuccessfully attempted to remove sections of Playboy Magazine's braille edition, which was produced using federal funds through the Library of Congress. During appropriations discussions in July 1985, Wylie successfully passed a motion in the House to reduce the budget of the Library of Congress by $103,000, which was the exact amount it cost to produce the braille edition of Playboy, subsequently leading to the discontinuation of the magazine. This would be later reversed by a 1986 ruling in federal district court from Judge Thomas Hogan, who ruled that Congress' actions were a violation of the first amendment. Production of the Playboy braille edition resumed in January 1987.

References 

 
 

1920 births
1998 deaths
Republican Party members of the Ohio House of Representatives
American prosecutors
American cooperative organizers
Harvard Law School alumni
Ohio State University alumni
Otterbein University alumni
United States Army colonels
United States Army personnel of World War II
Politicians from Columbus, Ohio
People from Muskingum County, Ohio
People from Licking County, Ohio
20th-century American lawyers
20th-century American politicians
Lawyers from Columbus, Ohio
Republican Party members of the United States House of Representatives from Ohio